Corny can refer to:


Places
 Corny, Eure, a town in northern France
 Corny Lake, Minnesota, United States

People
 Emmanuel Héré de Corny (1705–1763), French architect
 Kuźma Čorny (1900–1944), Byelorussian Soviet poet, writer, dramatist and journalist
 Corny Collins (born 1933), German former actress
 Cornelius Johnson (athlete) (1913–1946), American high jumper
 Cornelius Corny Littmann (born 1953), German entrepreneur
 Cornelius Corny Ostermann (1911–1940s), German musician and jazz bandleader

Other uses
 Corny (Veronica Mars), a TV character
 Cornelius keg, also known as a Corny, a stainless steel soft drink container

See also
 Corny-sur-Moselle, a town in north-eastern France

Hypocorisms